The 301st Air Refueling Wing is an inactive unit of the United States Air Force being last assigned to the Strategic Air Command at Malmstrom Air Force Base, Montana, where it was inactivated on 1 June 1992.

History
 See the 301st Operations Group for related history and lineage.
Activated 5 November 1947. Assigned to Strategic Air Command. Equipped with B-29 Superfortresses. Conducted strategic bombardment training, 1947–1948, and aerial gunnery training for other SAC organizations, November 1947 – January 1948.

Reassigned to Barksdale AFB, Louisiana in 1949, the 301st was one of the first units to conduct aerial refueling operations with the KB-29 tanker version of the Superfortress. Replaced the propeller-driven B-29s with new B-47E Stratojet swept-wing medium bombers in 1953, capable of flying at high subsonic speeds and primarily designed for penetrating the airspace of the Soviet Union. Also upgraded its KB-29 tankers to the dedicated Boeing KC-97 Stratofreighter. The mission of the 301st was to train for strategic bombing missions and to conduct aerial refueling. The wing deployed to England in 1953 and to French Morocco in 1954.

It was reassigned to Lockbourne AFB, Ohio on 15 April 1958 where it became an Electronic Countermeasures (ECM) unit and was engaged in various clandestine intelligence missions. Although equipped with the B-47E Stratojet, the 301st added electronic countermeasure activities to other missions in 1958 with the addition of the RB-47E and later EB-47E. With these aircraft, the wing soon devoted most of its activity to ECM work. The RB-47 carried out many ferret missions around the periphery of Soviet territory, and sometimes inside. In the early 1960s, the B-47 was considered to be reaching obsolescence, and was being phased out of SAC's strategic arsenal.  Began sending its stratojets to Davis-Monthan AFB in late 1963, the last EB-47E going to storage in 1964.

Became an air refueling wing in April 1964, discontinuing all previous missions. In addition, participated in the post attack command and control system from 3 March 1965 to 30 June 1966.

From around 9 June to 8 October 1972, most of the wing headquarters staff, all tactical aircraft and crews, and most of the maintenance personnel, plus support personnel in
various categories, deployed in Southeast Asia (U-Tapao RTNAF), attached to other SAC organizations. A reduced wing headquarters remained in the United States to administer activities of the combat support group and hospital at Lockbourne AFB, Ohio.

From 19 December 1972 to 18 January 1973, the wing repeated previous deployed condition on a smaller scale, with deployed resources forming a provisional air refueling squadron at Clark AB in the Philippines.

The 301st ARW was inactivated on 30 November 1979 in conjunction with SAC turning over Rickenbacker to the Air National Guard. Its KC-135As were sent to various Air National Guard units.

The Wing was reactivated on 8 January 1988 at Malmstrom AFB, MT, and assigned to 4th Air Division, Strategic Air Command. It was equipped with KC-135s. It was inactivated on 1 June 1992.

Lineage

 Established as 301st Bombardment Wing, Very Heavy, on 15 October 1947
 Organized on 5 November 1947
 Discontinued on 1 August 1948.
 Re-designated: 301st Bombardment Wing, Medium, and activated on 1 August 1948
 301st Bombardment Group, Medium, assigned as subordinate unit
 Group element inactivated 16 June 1952
 Re-designated: 301st Air Refueling Wing, Heavy on 15 June 1964
 Inactivated on: 30 November 1979
 Activated on: 8 January 1988
 Group element re-designated as 301st Operations Group, 29 August 1991
 Re-designated: 301st Air Refueling Wing on 1 September 1991
 Group element re-activated and assigned as group element
 Inactivated on: 1 June 1992

Assignments
 Fifteenth Air Force, 5 November 1947 – 1 August 1948; 1 August 1948
 Second Air Force, 1 April 1950
 4th Air Division, 10 February 1951
 Attached to: 7th Air Division, 3 December 1952–c. 4 March 1953
 Attached to: 5th Air Division, c. 10 February–c. 17 April 1954
 801st Air Division, 15 April 1958
 817th Air Division, 15 March 1965
 57th Air Division, 15 November 1965
 40th Air Division, 2 July 1966
 42d Air Division, 31 March 1970
 40th Air Division, 1 July 1973
 42d Air Division, 1 July 1975 – 30 November 1979
 Fifteenth Air Force, 8 January 1988
 40th Air Division, 7 July 1989
 Fifteenth Air Force, 1 September 1991 – 1 June 1992

Stations
 Smoky Hill AAF (AFB), Kansas, 5 November 1947 – 1 August 1948; 1 August 1948
 Barksdale AFB, Louisiana, 7 November 1949
 RAF Lakenheath, England, May–December 1950
 Lockbourne (later, Rickenbacker) AFB, Ohio, 15 April 1958 – 30 November 1979
 Malmstrom AFB, Montana, 8 January 1988 – 1 June 1992

Components
Wings
 22d Bombardment Wing: attached 1 August 1948 – 9 May 1949 (not operational)
 97th Bombardment Wing: attached 17 March–16 May 1948

Groups
 22d Bombardment Group: attached 18 May–1 August 1948; attached 1 August–15 November 1948; attached February–9 May 1949
 301st Bombardment (later Operations) Group: 5 November 1947 – 1 August 1948 (detached July 1948); 1 August 1948 – 16 June 1952 (detached 1 August 1948 – January 1949, 15 May–30 November 1950; not operational, 10 February 1951 – 16 June 1952), 1 September 1991 – 1 June 1992

Squadrons
 32d Bombardment (later Air Refueling) Squadron: attached 10 February 1951 – 15 June 1952, assigned 16 June 1952 – 8 June 1964; assigned 15 March 1965 (not operational, c. 9 June–8 October 1972)
 91st Air Refueling Squadron: attached 4 May–14 June 1964, assigned 15 June 1964 – 1 July 1971
 301st Air Refueling Squadron: assigned to 301st Bomb Wing March 1949, TDY Lakenheath UK May–December 1950, attached 10 February 1951 – 15 June 1952, assigned 16 June 1952 – 15 April 1958 (detached 20–26 June 1955, 10 July–18 September 1955, 27 April–27 June 1956, 15 November–6 December 1956, 27 December 1956 – 28 February 1957); assigned 30 September 1973 – 31 December 1975
 321st Air Refueling Squadron: 15 April 1958 – 15 March 1965 (detached 11 April–13 July 1960, 3 October 1961 – January 1962)
 352d Bombardment Squadron: attached 10 February–20 September 1951; attached 20 December 1951 – 15 June 1952, assigned 16 June 1952 – 8 June 1964
 353d Bombardment Squadron: attached 10 February 1951 – 15 June 1952, assigned 16 June 1952 – 8 June 1964
 376th Air Refueling Squadron: attached 1 December 1957 – 15 April 1958
 419th Bombardment Squadron: 1 December 1958 – 1 January 1962
 4363d Post Attack Command and Control: attached 15–25 March 1965.

Aircraft flown
 B-29 Superfortress, 1947–1953
 Boeing KB-29, 1949–1953
 B-47 Stratojet, 1953–1961, 1963–1964, RB-47 1958, EB-47 1961–1965
 KC-97 Stratofreighter, 1953–1961, 1962–1963
 Boeing EC-135,1964–1966
 KC-135 Stratotanker, 1963–1979

See also
 List of B-29 Superfortress operators
 List of B-47 units of the United States Air Force

References
 Notes

Bibliography

 Muirhead, John. Those Who Fall. New York: Random House, 1986.
 
 
 Werrell, Kenneth P. Who Fears: The 301st in War and Peace, 1942–1979. Dallas, Texas: Taylor Publishing Company, 1991.
 Commemorating the Tour of duty of the 301st Bombardment Wing in the United Kingdom, May–December 1950, Album published by West Suffolk Newspapers Ltd. Bury St. St. Edmunds, Suffolk, UK on behalf of 301st BW Public Information Office

External links
 301st Bomb Group Website
 301st Bomb Wing at Strategic-Air-Command.com
 301st Bomb Wing at globalsecurity.org

Units and formations of Strategic Air Command
Military units and formations established in 1947
0301
1947 establishments in Kansas
1992 disestablishments in Montana